The Wellington Farm Historic District encompasses a historic farm property at 487—500 Wellesley Street in Weston, Massachusetts.  Included in the  district are a main house built c. 1760, a barn complex with buildings dating from the 19th and 20th centuries, a modern greenhouse, and farm fields lined by stone walls.  It is historically significant for its well-preserved buildings, and for its later transformation into a summer estate.  It is also one of the town's few remaining working farms.  The district was listed on the National Register of Historic Places in 1988.

Description and history
The property is roughly bisected by Wellesley Street, just south of the Massachusetts Turnpike, and is roughly bounded on the south by Glen Road. Open fields line the road, with two separate farmstead complexes on either side. The one to the east has a farmhouse built about 1760, with later modifications around 1800 and 1900, while that on the west side has an early 20th-century house with more modern outbuildings for the farm operations.

Part of this property was first recorded in 1770, when the house on the east side was already standing. The property was operated as a farm until the end of the 19th century, at which time it was turned into a summer estate. It was acquired by Arthur Wight Wellington, president of U.S. Leather, in 1907, and remains in that family.

See also
National Register of Historic Places listings in Weston, Massachusetts

References

Historic districts in Middlesex County, Massachusetts
Buildings and structures in Weston, Massachusetts
National Register of Historic Places in Middlesex County, Massachusetts
Historic districts on the National Register of Historic Places in Massachusetts
Farms on the National Register of Historic Places in Massachusetts